Tricholomella is a fungal genus in the family Lyophyllaceae. The genus is monotypic, containing the single species Tricholomella constricta, described as new to science by Ukrainian mycologist Mariya Yakovlevna Zerova in 1979. Zerova's original publication was invalid, and it was later republished validly by Kuulo Kalamees in 1992. The fungus is found in Asia and Europe.

See also

 List of Agaricales genera

References

Lyophyllaceae
Fungi of Asia
Fungi of Europe
Monotypic Agaricales genera